The Linden Museum (German: Linden-Museum Stuttgart. Staatliches Museum für Völkerkunde) is an ethnological museum located in Stuttgart, Germany. The museum features cultural artifacts from around the world, including South and Southeast Asia, Africa, the Islamic world from the Near East to Pakistan, China and Japan, and artifacts from North and Latin America and Oceania.

The museum traces its origins to the collection of objects amassed by the Verein für Handelsgeographie (Association for Trade Geography) in the 19th century. The namesake of the museum is Karl Graf von Linden (1838–1910) who, as president of the Stuttgart Verein für Handelsgeographie, took an interest in assembling and organizing the collection, and invited explorers of the caliber of Sven Hedin and Roald Amundsen to Stuttgart.

In 1911, the collection was established as a private museum and its current building was constructed. After suffering extensive damage during World War II, the building was restored in the 1950s and the municipality became its custodian. Since 1973, the museum has been jointly administrated by the city of Stuttgart and the state of Baden-Württemberg.

Gallery

External links
 Linden-Museum Stuttgart at Google Cultural Institute

References

Asian art museums in Germany
Ethnographic museums in Germany
Museums established in 1911
Museums in Stuttgart
1911 establishments in Germany
20th-century establishments in Württemberg